Maria Pavlovna Prilezhayeva (Мария Павловна Прилежаева, June 22, 1903 in Yaroslavl, Russian Empire – April 8, 1989 in Moscow, USSR) was a Russian/Soviet children's author, literary critic and the Soviet Union of Writers official, best known for her novel The Life of Lenin (1970) which earned her the Nadezda Krupskaya RSFSR State Prize in 1971 and later the Order of Lenin.

Biography
Maria Prilezhayeva was born in Yaroslavl to a family of impoverished gentry. Her childhood years were spent in Alexandrov. At the age of 16, having graduated from a local school, she started to work as a teacher in a village. In 1925 Prilezhayeva enrolled into the Moscow University pedagogical faculty which she graduated five years later, to go on teaching in schools, in Arkhangelsk, Zagorsk and Moscow.

In 1936, she started working for magazines and newspaper, reviewing books of Russian and foreign authors. In 1941, having learned of one of her favorite student's death in the Winter War, she wrote her first novel Etot God (That Year). Several more school-themed books followed, including Semiklassnitsy (The 7th Form Girls, 1944) and Yunost Mashi Strogovoi (The Youth of Masha Strogova, 1948). Describing herself as a 'lyrical realist', Prilezhayeva cited Lev Tolstoy, Anton Chekhov and Alexander Blok as her major influences.

From the mid-1950s, Prilezhayeva's books became more politically engaged. S Beregov Medveditsy (From the Medveditsa River Banks, 1955) novel related the life story of Mikhail Kalinin. Her 1970 novel Zhizn Lenina (The Life of Lenin) earned her the N.K. Krupskaya RSFSR State Prize (1971) and later the Lenin Komsomol Prize (1983).

As a Soviet Union of Writers's official, it was Prilezhayeva's duty to take part in all of the meetings concerning the dissidents' cases, but next to her colleagues she was considered a liberal. Author and lawyer Arkady Waksberg mentioned her among those who (unsuccessfully) tried to help out poet Lev Kvitko, one of the victims to the so-called 'uprooting cosmopolitism' campaign. Polezhayeva did a lot to support young authors: Anatoly Aleksin, Mikhail Alekseev, Albert Likhanov, Azat Abdullin were among her literary protégés.

Perestroika forced Prilezhayeva to reconsider her beliefs. "Some of my ideals have crashed... But how stupidly have they trampled them under feet, and how silly and naive those believes of mine have been," she wrote in a diary in June 1987. Maria Prilezhayeva died on April 8, 1989, in Moscow.

References 

1903 births
1989 deaths
Russian children's writers
Soviet children's writers
Soviet short story writers
Soviet novelists
20th-century Russian short story writers
Soviet women writers
Recipients of the Order of Lenin
People from Yaroslavl
Russian women short story writers
Russian women children's writers
20th-century women writers
Soviet women novelists